Parliamentary elections were held in Finland between 1 and 3 March 1919. The Social Democratic Party emerged as the largest in Parliament with 80 of the 200 seats. Voter turnout was 67.1%.

Background
In 1919, Finland was still reeling from the violent and traumatic effects of its Civil War. Many Whites (rightists and centrists) felt that a strong national government was necessary to prevent a new civil war. Some conservatives, especially monarchists, even wondered if Finland should keep its democratic and universal right to vote (for example Carl Gustaf Emil Mannerheim, in the White Army's victory parade in Helsinki in May 1918, he called for the giving of Finland's leadership to a strong leader, free from partisan wrangling).

Liberals, such as the first President Kaarlo Juho Ståhlberg, believed that discontent with Finland's political, social and economic order would be removed by making reforms. Monarchists had elected Prince Frederick Charles of Hesse (a state of Germany) as the Finnish King in October 1918, but he had renounced the throne in December 1918, conscious of the problems that Finland would have in its relations with the United Kingdom and the United States if it had a citizen of the defeated Germany as its king. The parties that favoured a republic (Social Democrats, Agrarians and Progressives) disagreed on how much power the head of state (President) should have. The monarchist parties (National Coalitioners and Swedish People's Party) favoured a strong presidency if there was going to be a republic at all.

In the end, enough Finnish voters sided with the pro-republic parties that also promised significant social reforms, such as the freeing of tenant farmers and the distribution of excess farmland to them.

Results

See also
List of members of the Parliament of Finland, 1919–1922

References

General elections in Finland
Finland
Parliament
Finland
Election and referendum articles with incomplete results